is a song by Japanese singer Ado, released as her debut single on October 23, 2020. It was released as a digital single through Virgin Music.

The song's lyrics criticize society's so called "common sense", with Ado speaking on behalf of members of society about their dissatisfaction and anger with society. The song became popular among the younger generations in Japan, and has even been called "2021 youth anthem".

Release
The original track was uploaded to YouTube on October 23, 2020, with an accompanying music video produced by Wooma. On December 2, 2020, a piano version of the song was released to commemorate the YouTube video of "Usseewa" surpassing 10 million views. On February 5, 2021, a remix of the song by Giga was released called "Usseewa (Giga Remix)".

Composition and lyrics 

"Usseewa" is Ado's first original song. The music was produced by Vocaloid producer , of whom Ado is a fan.

The term "Usseewa", roughly equivalent to "Shut up" in English, has been the topic of much debate. In particular, many parents in Japan have been worried about the effects of the song's lyrical content on young children. This subject was brought up on Fuji TV's High Noon TV Viking! MORE, as many children had started singing, or mimicking the song's lyrics in their speech. This has resulted in some nursery schools and kindergartens banning the song. , on the other hand, argues that children may sing the song just because it is catchy, and do not even understand the meaning of the words. She further states that it is almost impossible to avoid children hearing the song, as it is a major hit song played widely on TV and in shopping facilities.

Ado has expressed that the lyrics of the song are meant to help relieve the stress of her audience by resonating with their frustrations. She further states that she "sing[s] people's anger in their place, because [she] want[s] them to live positively."

Commercial performance
The song peaked at number 1 on Billboard Japan Hot 100, Oricon Digital Singles Chart, Oricon Streaming Chart, and Spotify Viral 50 Japan. The music video of the song on YouTube reached 100 million views in 148 days after its release. It also reached 100 million plays on Billboard Japan after 17 weeks from charting-in, which was the sixth fastest in history and the youngest for a solo singer. The song became a social phenomenon dominating Japanese music streaming sites and karaoke charts months after its release.

Charts

Weekly charts

Year-end charts

References 

2020 songs
2020 debut singles
Ado (singer) songs
Billboard Japan Hot 100 number-one singles
J-pop songs
Japanese-language songs